Held annually from 1994 to 2019 & since 2021, Rock Fest is the largest Rock Music and Camping Event in the US, featuring classic and modern rock & metal. It is an annual four-day music festival located near the town of Cadott, Wisconsin.

The venue hosts more than 7,000 Campsites for Campers with RV's or Tents, as well as the amphitheater concert grounds for the four days of shows that feature over 20 national rock music acts each year. On site there are also convenience stores, a merch store, concessions, and side stages that feature regional acts in between main stage performances.

Rock Fest is billed one of the premier outdoor rock music festivals in the United States. It is usually held on the third weekend (Wednesday–Saturday) of July.

There was no Rock Fest in 2020.

Attendance 
The annual attendance of Rock Fest is between 25,000 and 35,000 people daily.
Some daily crowds grow closer to 50,000 people; for example in 2012 when Iron Maiden headlined the Saturday night of the festival.

Attendance is made up mostly from the Midwest (Wausau, Wisconsin, Stevens Point, Wisconsin, Marshfield, Wisconsin area) and the Minneapolis, Minnesota area, but every state in the US is represented at this event as well as more than 14 countries outside the US.

2022 Lineup 

Day 1, Wednesday July 13

Who's on Top Stage
 Warrant (headliner) 
 Lita Ford
 Firehouse
 Paralandra

Budweiser's Boneyard Stage
 Versus Me
 Otherwise
 Islander
 Dead Original

Day 2, Thursday July 14

Main Stage
 Disturbed (headliner)
 Lamb of God
 Theory of a Deadman
 Hatebreed
 Ayron Jones
 Fire from the Gods
 Sweet Addiction

Who's on Top
 Unkle Daddy (after-party)
 Avatar (headliner)
 Spiritbox
 Diamante
 Ded
 Wildstreet
 The Midnight Devils

Jack's Tribute Stage
 Peace of Mind Rebel QueensLoud & Local Stage The Issue
 ViaBudweiser's Boneyard Stage NonGrata
 Half Heard Voices
 Seilies

Day 3, Friday July 15Main Stage Evanescence (headliner)
 Halestorm
 The Pretty Reckless
 Black Veil Brides
 Butcher Babies
 Volumes
 Plague of StarsWho's on Top Fingertrick (after-party)
 Nothing More
 Escape the Fate
 John 51
 Lilith Czar
 Streetlight Circus
 Bourbon HouseJack Daniel's Tribute Stage Fresh Fighters
 Sabbath UnleashedLoud & Local Stage Motherwind
 IgnescentBudweiser's Boneyeard Stage Lydia Can't Breathe
 Ratchet Dolls
 Once Around
 The Other LA

Day 4, Saturday July 16Main Stage Shinedown (headliner)
 Mudvayne
 Jelly Roll
 Starset
 Shaman's Harvest
 Lacey Sturm
 EaonWho's on Top Splitdriven (After-Party)
 Skillet (Headliner)
 Motionless in White
 From Ashes to New
 All Good Things
 Divide the Fall
 The RumoursJack Daniel's Tribute Stage 10,000 days
 Cowboys from HellLoud & Local Stage Imperial Fall
 Lake EffectBudweiser's Boneyard Stage Dreams Aside
 Velvet Chains
 Crashing Atlas

note1 Nina Straus Canceled and was replaced by John 5 at "Who's on Top".

 Previous lineups 

2021Wednesday, July 14: Queensrÿche, Slaughter, Joyous Wolf, Royal Bliss, The Black Moods, Stitched Up Heart, Modern Mimes, Unkle Daddy.Thursday, July 15: Rob Zombie (headliner), Staind, Anthrax, Steel Panther, Saint Asonia, Memphis May Fire, Fozzy, Nonpoint, Fire from the Gods, Carnifex, Any Given Sin, GFM, Falling Through April, Scattered Hamlet, Scattered Hamlet, Jett Threatt, NIVRANA, Digital Homicide, Anything But Human, Drama Queen, Contingency, Ignescent.Friday, July 16: Limp Bizkit (headliner), Corey Taylor (CMFT), Philip H. Anselmo & the Illegals, Badflower, Of Mice & Men, Tommy Vext, All That Remains, Bones UK, Blacktop Mojo, Crobot, City of the Weak, Throw the Fight, Siin, Silvertung, Wildstreet, Fool Fighters, Dressed to Kill, Hammer Down Hard, Distal Descent, Strange Daze, Caster Volor.  Saturday, July 17:  Korn (headliner), Danzig, Chevelle, Body Count, Pop Evil, We Came as Romans, Gemini Syndrome, Bad Omens, Hyro the Hero, Rachel Lorin, Your Screaming Silence, Evandale, Stormbreaker, Nuisance, Gypsy Road, Cowboys from Hell, Strate Jak It, Stellar Circuits, Probable Cause, FM Down.

20202020 Rock Fest canceled due to Covid-19.  Scheduled for July 16-18.  
Rock Fest Organizers said in a statement "In working with local health officials, we were told that having a festival of our size in July is at too high of a risk due to COVID-19. This is an unprecedented situation that we have to take seriously. The health and safety of our fans and rock music community is and always will be our #1 concern!,"

2019Wednesday, July 17:  Jackyl, Stryper, Kix, BobaFlex, Rachel Lorin, He-Nis-Ra, Silvertung, Streetlight CircusThursday, July 18: Evanescence (headliner), Mastodon, Skillet, Starset, Static-X, Nonpoint, DevilDriver, Sylar, Dope, Rachel Lorin, Revenant Soul, Gabriel and the Apocalypse, Sweet Addiction, The 9th Planet Out, Madman's Diary, Bleak Sabbath, The Zealots, Cold Kingdom, Krashkarma, Stare Across Un-Broken.Friday, July 19: Five Finger Death Punch (headliner), Breaking Benjamin, Three Days Grace, Killswitch Engage, Asking Alexandria, Bad Wolves, Ice Nine Kills, From Ashes to New, I See Stars, Shallow Side, Rachel Lorin, Helivs, Stormbreaker, Days to Come, Sin7, Who's Who, Stone Type Pilots, Ignescent, Kore Rozzik, Reason Define, Catechize.  Saturday, July 20: Rob Zombie (headliner), Marilyn Manson, In This Moment, I Prevail, P.O.D. Lacuna Coil, Red Sun Rising, Ded, Diamante, Eve to Adam, Jacob Cade, The Rumours, Lydia Can't Breathe, A Light Divided, Piranha, TNT, Roxz, Neverwake, Standing Alliance, Electric Revolution.

2018Wednesday, July 11:  Who's on Top: Ace Frehley, Skid Row, Autograph, Hammer Down Hard.  Budweiser Grab Some Buds Stage: Filthy Sweet, Soil, Beyond Threshold, Blacklite District.Thursday, July 12: Main Stage: Incubus, Rise Against, Seether, Nothing More, Red, Blacktop Mojo, Dead Girls Academy.  Who's on Top: Everyday Losers, GWAR, Beartooth, Through Fire, Nuisance2, Scattered Hamlet, Lydia Can't Breathe.  Jack Daniel's Tribute Stage: Old Voltage, Nivrana.  Loud & Local Stage: Greater than Three, Lady Luck.  Budweiser Grab Some Buds Stage: The Missing Letters, Emissary EchoFriday, July 13: Main Stage: Godsmack, Halestorm, Bush, Dee Snider, Trivium, DED, Shallow Side.  Who's on Top: Aeous (after-party), Pop Evil (headliner), Fozzy, Otep, Arena, Mary Ann Cotton, Standing Alliance.  Jack Daniel's Tribute Stage: Cowboys from Hell, Black Rainbow.  Loud & Local Stage: Benjamin Raye Band, Picard.  Budweiser Grab Some Buds Stage: Amerakin Overdose, Crashing AtlasSaturday, July 14: Main Stage: Disturbed, A Day to Remember, Black Label Society, Underoath, Attila, Deadset Society, Wayland.  Who's on Top: Nuisance1 (after-party), Sevendust (headliner), Adelitas Way, Powerman 5000, The Goodbars, Screaming for Silence, Strate Jak It.  Jack Daniel's Tribute Stage: Ozzbournes, Maiden Minneapolis.  Loud & Local Stage: The Cragars, Smiling Politely.  Budweiser Grab Some Buds Stage: GFM, Brokenrail

note2 Hellbelly Canceled and was replaced by Nuisance for the after-party at "Who's on Top".

2017Wednesday, July 12: RATT, Faster Pussycat, Jack Russell's Great White, The Good Bars.Thursday, July 13: Slayer, Volbeat, Lamb of God, Anthrax, Failure Anthem, Badflower, Rachel Lorin, Antistar, Awaken the Shadow, Gemini Syndrome, Mushroomhead, Insane Clown Posse, The 9th Planet Out, Hand of the Tribe, The Zealots, Valora, The Nearly Deads, Anthem, Probable Cause, Kissin Time (Kiss cover band), Cowboys from Hell (Pantera cover band).Friday, July 14: Avenged Sevenfold, Korn, Stone Sour, Clutch, Avatar, Lacey Sturm, One Less Reason, Valora, The Nearly Deads, Hand of the Tribe, VIA, Stare Across, Oblivious Signal, Nuisance, Scattered Hamlet, Texas Hippie Coalition, Lita Ford, Cinderella's Tom Keifer, Emperors n Elephants.Saturday, July 15: Rob Zombie, Shinedown, Megadeth, Sevendust (cancelled and replaced by Adam Gontier), LIT, Devour the Day, City of the Weak, Fall II Rise, Veilside, Shallow Side, VIMIC, Thousand Foot Krutch, HellYeah, Matrekis, Wrecked, Ignescent, 7's Catacomb, My Memory Remains, Who's Who (The Who Cover Band), The Crown Jewels (Queen Cover Band).

 2016 Wednesday, July 13 (Bonus Bash): Cold Kingdom, Silversyde, Screaming for Silence, Chaotic Resemblance, Prophets of Addiction, 3 Pill Morning, Bobaflex, Faster Pussycat, Led Zeppelin 2, KIX, QueensrycheThursday, July 14: Truth Before Treason, Bad Remedy, Emissary Echo, Oblivious Signal, Gabriel and the Apocalypse, Silversyde, Seven Days Lost, Acillatem, TNT, Stitched up Heart, Art of Dying, Like a Storm, Red Sun Rising, Nothing More, Sick Puppies, Hollywood Undead, Skillet, Marilyn Manson, Hollywood VampiresFriday, July 15: Myrriya, Aeraco, Strange Daze, Cold Kingdom, Fatal Kaliber, Vaudeville, Dellacoma, Station, Nivrana, Maiden Minneapolis, Beyond Threshold, 3 Pill Morning, Wayland, Escape the Fate, 10 Years, Adelitas Way, Saint Asonia, Scott Stapp, Rise Against, Breaking Benjamin, Alice in ChainsSaturday July 16: Rising Rocker, My Memory Remains, Smiling Politely, Malice, Veilside, Antistar, Every Mother's Nightmare, The Blackfires, Who's Who, Electric Eye, I Prevail, Bridge to Grace, Wilson, New Year's Day, Atreyu, All that Remains, In This Moment, Bullet for my Valentine, Five Finger Death Punch, Slipknot

 2015 Thursday, July 16: Vaudeville, New Medicine, Nothing More, Finger Eleven, Killswitch Engage, ShinedownFriday, July 17: King Shifter, A.D.D., Starset, Jackyl, Black Stone Cherry, Three Days Grace, GodsmackSaturday July 18: Emperors N Elephants, Islander, Shaman's Harvest, Adelitas Way, Hinder, Breaking Benjamin, Judas PriestSunday July 19: Emergent, Kyng, All That Remains, Pop Evil, Chevelle, Avenged Sevenfold

Nickelback was to originally play Friday but canceled later on.

2014Thursday, July 17: Wayland, Winger, Steel Panther, REO Speedwagon, Sammy HagarFriday, July 18: Devour The Day, Pop Evil, Sick Puppies, Alter Bridge, Five Finger Death PunchSaturday, July 19: Eve To Adam, The Pretty Reckless, Live, Cheap Trick, AerosmithSunday, July 20: Thousand Foot Krutch, Redlight King, P.O.D., Stone Sour, Rob Zombie (failed to perform)

2013Thursday, July 18: Aranda, All That Remains, Halestorm, Seether, Three Days GraceFriday, July 19: Bumblefist, 4th Floor, In This Moment, Nonpoint, Pop Evil, Theory of a Deadman, The Offspring, KornSaturday, July 20: 7 Sins, Vaudeville, Warrant, Hellyeah, Stone Sour, Slash, Megadeth, KISSSunday, July 21: Dirtee Circus, Otherwise, Device, Skillet, Whitesnake, Mötley Crüe

In This Moment had a scheduling conflict and withdrew from Rock Fest, Nonpoint was announced as their replacement on February 26, 2013.
Stone Sour had a scheduling conflict and withdrew from Rock Fest, Slash was announced as their replacement on April 26, 2013.

2012Thursday, July 19: Dilana, Art of Dying, Black Stone Cherry, Buckcherry, ShinedownFriday, July 20: 10 Years, Halestorm, Hollywood Undead, Five Finger Death Punch, GodsmackSaturday, July 21: Dory Drive, Adelitas Way, Sevendust, Papa Roach, Alice Cooper, Iron MaidenSunday, July 22: FireHouse, Lita Ford, Sebastian Bach, Poison, Def Leppard

2011Thursday, July 14: Slaughter, Cinderella, Three Days Grace, Rob ZombieFriday, July 15: Rock Sugar, Saliva, Skillet, Hinder, Kid RockSaturday, July 16: My Darkest Days, Sick Puppies, Chevelle, Seether, Avenged SevenfoldSunday, July 17:' Jackyl, Tesla, Heart, Ted Nugent, Def Leppard, Stone Temple PilotsHeart and Def Leppard did not perform, the cancellation was due to the death of Joe Elliot's father. Ted Nugent and Stone Temple Pilots was announced as the replacements two days before the show.2010

Vic Ferrari, Apocalyptica, Theory of a Deadman, Daughtry, Gravel Switch, Default, Red Jumpsuit Apparatus, Soul Asylum, Skillet, 3 Doors Down, Elements, Elmwood, Candlebox, Blue October, Collective Soul, John Mellencamp, Black Valentyne, Sleeper Cell, Trapt, Drowning Pool, Limp Bizkit, Alice in Chains

2009

Bad Downs, Blackberry Smoke, Saving Abel, Steve Miller Band, Pheromones, Saliva, Lifehouse, Seether, Barenaked Ladies, Sheryl Crow, Half Life, The Whigs, Los Lonely Boys, Hoobastank, Judas Priest, Journey, Big Deeks, Sevendust, Shinedown, Buckcherry, Korn

2008

Vic Ferrari, Trixter, Poison, Boston, Catch Penny, Cowboy Mouth, Jackyl, Puddle of Mudd, Three Days Grace, Godsmack, Grid Lock, Big Deeks, Plain White T's, Switchfoot, Live, Goo Goo Dolls, Stone Temple Pilots, M!ss Crazy, Ligion, Dishwalla, Tesla, The Wallflowers, Matchbox Twenty

2007

World Classic Rockers, Dennis DeYoung, The New Cars, Deep Purple, Dying Breed, Saliva, Uncle Kracker, Grand Funk Railroad, Fuel, Godsmack, Big Deeks, Zed Leppelin, Mink, Cross Canadian Ragweed, The Tragically Hip, Collective Soul, Chicago, KISS, Rock County, Corey Stevens, Gov't Mule, Hinder, Third Eye Blind, 3 Doors Down

2006

10 Years, Cinderella, Cross Canadian Ragweed, George Thorogood, Grand Funk Railroad, Gregg Rolie, John Waite, Kansas, Kid Rock, Live, Mötley Crüe, Papa Roach, Poison, Puddle of Mudd, Sammy Hagar & The Wabos, Savoy Brown Fea. Kim Simmonds, Seven Mary Three, Staind, Tesla, WarrantGrand Funk Railroad did not perform as they experienced mechanical issues with their jet.''

2005

G.B. Leighton, April Wine, Everclear, Collective Soul, FireHouse, Ratt, UFO, Cinderella, Megadeth, Big Deeks, Wishbone Ash, Quiet Riot, BoDeans, Black Crowes, Tom Petty & The Heartbreakers, Gypsy, Head East, Great White, Jackyl, Cheap Trick, ZZ Top

2004

Rockslide, Vic Ferrari, Smash Mouth, Counting Crows, Kelly Keeling, Poco, Firefall, Spin Doctors, John Waite, Huey Lewis and the News, The Allman Brothers Band, Big Deeks, Y & T, Saliva, Tesla, Twisted Sister, Judas Priest, Phoenix, Newsboys, Paul Revere and the Raiders, REO Speedwagon, Styx, John Fogerty

2003

Phoenix, Dokken, Jackyl, Whitesnake, After Dark, Night Ranger, WAR, Twisted Sister, Alice Cooper, Def Leppard, Public Reaction, FireHouse, Loverboy, Grand Funk Railroad, Sammy Hagar, Lynyrd Skynyrd, 2nd Hand Stone, Eddie Money, Rick Springfield, .38 Special, Heart, Boston

2002

Vic Ferrari, Ronnie James Dio, The Scorpions, Deep Purple, Boogie & the YO-YO'Z, The Pat Travers Band, Average White Band, Creedence Clearwater Revisited, Ted Nugent, Journey, Road Trip, World Classic Rockers, Loverboy, Blondie, George Thorogood, Robert Plant, Glitch, Starship featuring Mickey Thomas, Toto (with Bobby Kimball), Cinderella, Poison, Meat Loaf

2001

Boom Candle, Tesla, Bad Company - Paul Rodgers, Lynyrd Skynyrd, Bad Boy, Jackyl, Skid Row, Joan Jett & The Blackhearts, Queensryche, David Lee Roth, Badaz, Air Supply, America, Pat Benatar, Billy Squier, The Guess Who, Toy Boys, Slaughter, Uriah Heep, Blue Oyster Cult, Jethro Tull, Ted Nugent

2000

Howard Guitar Luedtke & Blue Max, Vic Ferrari, Styx, REO Speedwagon, Mean Street, Wizenhiemers, Air Supply, Kenny Wayne Shepherd Band, Joe Walsh, George Thorogood and the Destroyers, Glitch, The Toy Boys, .38 Special, Creedence Clearwater Revisited, Sammy Hagar and the Waboritas, Billy Idol, The Biscuit, Bad Boy, David Clayton Thomas and Blood, Sweat and Tears, WAR, Doobie Brothers, Poison

1999

The Chris Aaron Band, America, Blue Oyster Cult, Lynyrd Skynyrd, Captain Jack, Wizenhiemers, Gov't Mule, Kansas, The Scorpions, Mötley Crüe, Def Leppard, Chic Tracy, Amy & The Toy Boys, Survivor, The Dweebs, Marques Bovre & The Evil Twins, Joan Jett & The Blackhearts, Peter Frampton, Foreigner, Journey, Sammy Hagar, Pat Benatar, Poison, Rick Springfield

1998

Aja, America, Eddie Money, Steve Miller Band, Shatter Maxx, Vic Ferrari, David Clayton Thomas & Blood, Sweat and Tears, Creedence Clearwater Revisited, Alice Cooper, Howard Guitar Luedtke & Blue Max, High Risk Band, .38 Special, Molly Hatchet, Grand Funk Railroad

1997

Paul Rodgers, The Marshall Tucker Band, Lynyrd Skynyrd, Vic Ferrari, Little Feat, Cosmo's Factory (CCR), Ozark Mountain Daredevils, ZZ Top, Eric Burdon, B.T.O., Air Supply, RATT, Boston, The Guess Who, Nazareth, Loverboy, Kansas, REO Speedwagon, Not Responsible, Scarlet Runner, Finger, Fat Cats, The MAXX, Motely Crue, Sammy Hagar, Def Leppard

1996

Johnny Clueless, Violent Femmes, Golden Smog, Sheryl Crow, The Romantics, Fabulous Thunderbirds, Kansas, Little River Band, Smithereens, Big Head Todd and the Monsters, Bad Company, Ted Nugent, Starship featuring Mickey Thomas, The Freddy Jones Band, Eddie Money, The BoDeans, Doobie Brothers, Road Trip, High Risk, Not Responsible, Vic Ferrari, Inside Out Band, Vital Sign, New Sun Union, Jonny Lang

1995

Lamont Cranston, Loverboy, AirKraft, Rare Earth, Molly Hatchet, Starship featuring Mickey Thomas, Cheap Trick, Pat Benatar, Eric Burdon, E.L.O. part II, The Allman Brothers Band, Bruce Hornsby, Kansas, Little River Band, Fleetwood Mac, Foreigner, G.B. Leighton, Freckles and the Hostages, Palace, Kidd Gloves, The Hoopsnakes, Roadtrip, Vic Ferrari, Shady Glenn, Milestone, Recipe X, Inside Out Band

1994

John Kay and Steppenwolf, Cheap Trick, Mitch Ryder, B.T.O., Foghat, Eddie Money, Guess Who, Blood, Sweat and Tears, Survivor, REO Speedwagon, Big Grin, Head East, Radio Flyer, Palace, Hanna Storm, Recipe X

References

External links
 Official Rock Fest website

Rock festivals in the United States
Tourist attractions in Chippewa County, Wisconsin